Seána Talbot is a former president of the British charity National Childbirth Trust (NCT). Talbot became a member of NCT in 1995. She was elected as a trustee in 2009. Elected as President by NCT members in September 2015, at the annual general meeting. According to one news account, she was pressured into resigning along with a fellow trustee in December 2016, after a child died of cot death in a cot endorsed by the trust.

She has held various health management posts in Northern Ireland, and in 2014, was appointed as non-executive director on the board of the Patient and Client Council.

References 

Year of birth missing (living people)
Living people
Maternity in the United Kingdom
Leaders of organizations
People from Northern Ireland